Toyeri may refer to:
 Toyeri people, an ethnic group of Peru
 Toyeri language, a language of Peru